Homoeothrix is a genus of cyanobacteria.

References

Cyanobacteria genera
Oscillatoriales